Abate Mekuria (1944 – 20 July 2016) was an Ethiopian director, playwright, choreographer, and producer of shows for television, film and theatre.

Early life 
Abate was born in Addis Ababa. He attended the then Haile Selassie University, where he majored in English and minored in Theatre during the 1960s.

Career 
Abate Mekuria began his career working with American playwright and director Philip Caplan, who collaborated with several major contemporary Ethiopian playwrights and actors such as Tesfaye Gessesse, Debebe Seifu and Wogayehu Negatu. Abate advanced his studies in theatre in Glasgow in the mid-1960s, and film in Germany in 1969-1970 before pursuing a Directing course in London.

Best known for his Shakespearean plays translated into Amharic, including adaptations of Macbeth, Othello, and Hamlet, Abate had a knack for making larger than life productions and complex plays. Dubbed the ‘King of Ethiopian Opera’ Abate Mekuria found his passion melding music and theatre.

From 1976, in the capacity as director at the Ethiopian National Theatre until the 1991 revolution, Abate worked closely with Tsegaye Gabre-Medhin, who for years almost exclusively wrote plays that Abate would direct. Abate's talent would transform Tsegaye's long (and sometimes boring) monologues into captivating drama.

In 1990 he penned and directed The Shoe Shine Boys opera, which dealt with contemporary social issues of Ethiopia's lower classes, this would lead to government pressure, who viewed the play tarnished its image.

Criticism 
Jane Plastow in her 1996 book, criticized Abate Mekuria's and Tsegaye Gabre-Medhin's control over the theatre. A skit has been circulating since 1987 which showed the scheme of the two men planning a programme to maintain their stranglehold over the theatre until 2010. From his appointment in 1976 up to 1987, Abate refused to admit university graduates to the theatre despite pressures to do so, while other theatre houses did provide opportunities to students and young people. Plastow claimed that "Abate Mekuria stood out as the director most jealously retaining his power, and possibly most nervous about losing it". It was not until his rift with Tsegaye Gabre-Medhin in 1988 that Abate changed course, and allowed graduates to the theatre and plays by a variety of writers, in his final years at the theatre.

Legacy 
Abate Mekuria passed away on July 20, 2016, in Addis Ababa Hiwot Hospital due to prostate cancer.

List of plays 

 Haltu Be Sidist Wer (1966)
 Othello (1973) 
 Hamus (1978)
 Epides Negus (1988)
 Be Hamle Chereka Guzo (1996)
 Afageshign (2003)

References 

1944 births
2016 deaths
Ethiopian dramatists and playwrights